Herman Johannes (28 May 1912 – 17 October 1992) was an Indonesian professor, scientist, politician and National Hero. Johannes was the rector of Universitas Gadjah Mada in Yogyakarta (1961–1966), Coordinator for Higher Education from 1966 to 1979, a member of Indonesia's Presidential Supreme Advisory Council (Dewan Pertimbangan Agung or DPA) from 1968 to 1978, and the Minister for Public Works and Energy (1950–1951). He was also a member of the Executive Board of UNESCO from 1954 to 1957.

Biography 
Herman Johannes graduated from Technische Hogeschool (THS) in Bandung, West Java, an institution which was moved to Yogyakarta in 1946 during the war of independence with the Dutch. The institution later became the embryo of Gadjah Mada University.

During his academic career, Johannes carried out research on rural technology, including inventing a charcoal stove designed especially for the poor, which used biomass charcoal briquettes for fuel. Johannes also investigated other types of alternative fuels and explored the possibility of turning agricultural waste into fuel.

Herman Johannes was involved in the military in 1940s.  He was the head of the Indonesian Army Arsenal Laboratory during the independence war against Dutch occupation. His laboratory produced explosives such as smoke bombs and hand grenades which were used by Indonesian guerrillas to sabotage the movement of the Dutch military in Central Java.

Herman Johannes married Annie Marie Gilbertine Amalo in 1955. They had four children: Christine, Henriette, Daniel Johannes and Helmi Johannes, a newscaster at the VOA.

Johannes was decorated with the Guerilla Medal in 1958 and Mahaputra Medal in 1973 by the Indonesian government. Herman Johannes died on 17 October 1992 of prostate cancer. He was buried at the Universitas Gadjah Mada Cemetery in Sawitsari, Yogyakarta. In November 2009, he was honored by the Indonesian government as a National Hero.

Legacy 
The Indonesian government honored Herman Johannes and named the Greater Forest Park in Kupang Regency in East Nusa Tenggara province after him. His name is used for a boulevard in downtown Yogyakarta.

His face is also depicted in the 100 Indonesian rupiah coins denomination in 2016.

Education 
 Melayu School, Baa, Rote Island, East Nusa Tenggara, Indonesia 1921
 Europesche Lagere School (ELS), Kupang, East Nusa Tenggara, Indonesia 1922
 Meer Uitgebreid Lager Onderwijs (MULO), Makassar, South Sulawesi, Indonesia 1928
 Algemene Middelbare School (AMS), Batavia, Java, Indonesia 1931
 Technische Hogeschool (THS), Bandung, West Java, Indonesia 1934

Career 
 Teacher, Cursus tot Opleiding van Middelbare Bouwkundingen (COMB), Bandung, 1940
 Teacher, High Middle School (SMT), Batavia, Java 1942
 Lecturer of Physics, Medical High School, Salemba, Jakarta, 1943
 Lecturer, Technical High School (STT) Bandung in Yogyakarta, 1946–1948
 Professor, STT Bandung in Yogyakarta, June 1948
 Dean, Technical Faculty, Universitas Gadjah Mada (UGM), Yogyakarta, 1951–1956
 Dean, Faculty of Natural Sciences (FIPA), Gadjah Mada University, Yogyakarta, 1955–1962
 Rector, Universitas Gadjah Mada, Yogyakarta, 1961–1966
 Coordinator of Higher Education (Koperti), Yogyakarta and Central Java, 1966–1979
 Chairman, Regional Science and Development Center (RSDC), Yogyakarta, 1969

Career (others) 
 Member, Central Indonesian National Committee (KNIP), 1945–1946
 Minister of Public Works and Energy, Indonesia, 1950–1951
 Member, Executive Board of UNESCO, 1954–1957
 Member, National Council, 1957–1958
 Member, National Development Council (Deppernas), 1958–1962
 Member, Supreme Advisory Council (Dewan Pertimbangan Agung or DPA) Indonesia, 1968–1978
 Member Commission of Four, 1970
 Member, Committee for Technical Terms, Department of Public Works, 1969–1975
 Member, Council of Indonesian-Malaysian Language (MABIM), 1972–1977
 Member, Indonesian National Research Council, 1985–1992

Military career
 Head of Arsenal Laboratory, Army Headquarters, Yogyakarta, 1946
 Member of Military Academy Troops, Jogjakarta, Sector Sub-Wehrkreise 104, December 1948 – June 1949
 Lecturer, Military Academy, Yogyakarta, 1946–1948
 Last Rank: Army Major, 1949
 Commandant, Yogyakarta Student Regiment (Resimen Mahakarta), 1962–1965

Organizations 
 Christen Studenten Vereniging (CSV), Bandung, 1934
 Indonesische Studenten Vereniging (ISV), Bandung, 1934
 Timorese Jongeren/Chairman of Timorese Nationalist Group (PKT), Bandung, 1934
 Member, Indonesian Young Civil Servants Association (AMPRI), Jakarta, 1945
 Chairman, Indonesian Lesser Sunda People's Movement (GRISK), 1947
 Founder, Greater Indonesia Party (PIR) 1948
 Chairman, Hatta Foundation, 1950–1992
 Chairman of Gadjah Mada University Alumni Association (KAGAMA), 1958–1961, 1973–1981
 Had been the Head of Yogyakarta's Veterans Legion
 Had been in the Central Board of the Indonesian Veterans Legion (LVRI)
 Member of Indonesian Engineers Association (PII)
 Had been an Hononary Member of the Indonesian Academy of Sciences (AIPI)

Decorations 
 Guerilla Medal, 1958
 Medal of Indonesian Independence Struggle, 1961
 Medal of Wirakarya, 1971
 Mahaputra Medal, 1973
 Doctor Honoris Causa, Gadjah Mada University, 1975
 Veterans Legion Medal, 1981
 Honor of Sri Sultan Hamengkubuwono IX, 1991
 Indonesian National Hero, 2009

Selected
 Basics of Modern Physics, (UGM, 1953)
 Pantjasila in the Words of Sukarno (UGM, 1963)
 Squeeze Techniques in Bridge (Indira, Jakarta, 1970)
 Introduction to Mathematics for Economics (with Budiono Sri Handoko; Pustaka LP3ES, Jakarta 1974)
 Scientific Language Terms (Gadjah Mada University, 1979)
 Developing Bahasa Indonesia into a Scientific, Aesthetic and Energetic Language, (UGM, 1980)
 Dictionary of Science and Technology (Indira, Jakarta, 1981)
 Various Techniques in Chess (Liberty, Yogyakarta, 1989)

References

1912 births
1992 deaths
Academic staff of Gadjah Mada University
Indonesian Christians
Indonesian politicians
Indonesian scientists
People from East Nusa Tenggara

National Heroes of Indonesia